Jodi Lyn O'Keefe (born October 10, 1978) is an American actress, model, and fashion designer. She came to prominence as Cassidy Bridges on the television series Nash Bridges (1996–2001) and played Gretchen Morgan on Prison Break (2007–2009), Jo Laughlin on The Vampire Diaries (2014–2017), and Lionel Davenport on Hit the Floor (2014–2018). Her film credits include Halloween H20 (1998) and She's All That (1999).

Early life
O'Keefe was born in the Cliffwood Beach section of Aberdeen Township, New Jersey, the daughter of Noreen, a homemaker, and Jack O'Keefe, a director of labor relations for Merck.

She graduated from St. John Vianney High School.

Career

O'Keefe started her career as a model at the age of eight, and she modeled for a jeans company. Midway through her junior year of high school, O'Keefe left school to star on the soap opera Another World, playing Marguerite "Maggie" Cory. She then got a role on Nash Bridges playing Cassidy, the daughter of Don Johnson's title character. She and her mother moved to Hollywood so O'Keefe completed her schooling by mail.

Her film debut was in 1998, in Halloween H20: 20 Years Later and later starred in such films as The Crow: Salvation, Whatever It Takes and Devil in the Flesh 2. In 1999, she co-starred in the teen film She's All That (1999) as Taylor Vaughan alongside Freddie Prinze Jr. and Rachael Leigh Cook. When asked if it was hard to play her character of a high school prima donna, she replied, "Everybody knew a Taylor Vaughan in high school. Working in show business, you meet girls like that every day."

O'Keefe kept on filming both movies and Nash Bridges until the series ended in 2001. Later films have included Out for Blood, in which she played a vampire named Layla Simmons and Venice Underground. On the small screen, she has appeared in various shows including Dharma & Greg, Boston Legal, Two and a Half Men, Charmed, The Evidence, The Big Bang Theory, and Tru Calling.

In 2007, O'Keefe starred in the series Prison Break; in its third and fourth seasons. She said that she "truly loved" playing Gretchen Morgan, because it "challenged" her, and because Gretchen was the "polar opposite of her" and "was badass".

In 2014, O'Keefe was cast in a recurring role in VH1's TV series Hit the Floor, and appeared in the film Merry ExMas. That year, she had the recurring role of Jo in the sixth season of The CW series The Vampire Diaries. She reprised her role of Jo in the first season of Legacies.

In 2009, she appeared in the video game Command & Conquer: Red Alert 3 - Uprising.

On June 22, 2011, she started a clothing line, Queen George Clothing. In 2012, she launched a jewelry line, Q.

O'Keefe is a licensed bounty hunter together with her friend Victoria Pratt, with whom she starred in the movie A Nanny's Revenge.

Filmography

Film

Television

Video games
 Command & Conquer: Red Alert 3: Uprising (2009), as Kelly Weaver

References

External links
 
 
  Jodi Lyn O'Keefe as Lionel Davenport on VH1's Hit the Floor (TV series)

1978 births
Actresses from New Jersey
American child actresses
American female models
American film actresses
American soap opera actresses
American television actresses
Living people
People from Aberdeen Township, New Jersey
St. John Vianney High School (New Jersey) alumni
20th-century American actresses
21st-century American actresses